Y Garn is a top of Mynydd Drws-y-Coed in Snowdonia, north Wales and is the easterly end of the Nantlle Ridge.

It has steep north-facing cliffs, the summit area being the highest point on a broad rocky plateau. The summit plateau contains two large shelter cairns.

References

Betws Garmon
Llanllyfni
Mountains and hills of Gwynedd
Mountains and hills of Snowdonia
Hewitts of Wales
Nuttalls